Jeremy Seabrook (born 1939) is an English author and journalist specialising in social, environmental and development issues. His book The Refuge and the Fortress: Britain and the Flight from Tyranny was longlisted for the Orwell Prize.

Early life and career
Seabrook was born in Northampton. He was educated at Northampton Grammar School and Gonville and Caius College, Cambridge, graduating with a degree in Modern and Medieval Languages in 1960. He worked as a teacher and as a social worker, and began writing for the journal New Society in 1963. In addition to contributing articles to newspapers and magazines, Seabrook has also written numerous books and plays for television, radio and theatre, including several collaborations with his old schoolfriend Michael O'Neil.

Written works (partial list)
The Unprivileged (1973)
A Lasting Relationship (1976)
What went wrong?: Working People and the Ideals of the Labour Movement (1977) (published in the United States as What went wrong?: Why Hasn’t Having More Made People Happier?)
Working Class Childhood (1982)
Unemployment in the Eighties (1983)
Idea of Neighbourhood, The (1984)
Landscapes of Poverty (1985)
Life and Labour in a Bombay Slum (1987)
The Race for Riches: Human Cost of Wealth (1988)
The Myth of the Market: Promises and Illusions (1990)
Victims of Development: Resistance and Alternatives (1993)
Notes From Another India (1995)
In the Cities of the South (1996)
Travels in the Skin Trade (1996)
Love in a Different Climate: Men who have Sex with Men in India (1999)
Children of Other Worlds: Exploitation in the Global Market (2001)
Freedom Unfinished: Fundamentalism and Popular Resistance in Bangladesh Today (2001)
A World Growing Old (2003)
The Refuge and the Fortress: Britain and the Flight From Tyranny (2008)
The Song of the Shirt: Cheap Clothes Across Continents and Centuries (2014)

Turkish translations
Başka Dünyaların Çocukları: Küresel Piyasada Sömürü, çev: Onur Gayretli, Fol Kitap, 2021.

References

External links

 Official Site

English writers
English male writers
1939 births
Alumni of Gonville and Caius College, Cambridge
Living people
People educated at Northampton School for Boys